Baron Keith was a title that was created three times in British history, with all three creations in favour of the same person, Admiral the Honourable Sir George Keith Elphinstone. He was the fifth son of Charles Elphinstone, 10th Lord Elphinstone (see Lord Elphinstone for earlier history of the Elphinstone family) by his wife Lady Clementine, daughter of John Fleming, 6th Earl of Wigtown and Lady Mary, daughter of William Keith, 8th Earl Marischal (see Earl Marischal for earlier history of the Keith family). The first creation came in the Peerage of Ireland in 1797 when he was made Baron Keith, of Stonehaven Marrischal, with remainder in default of issue male of his own to his daughter and only child from his first marriage, Margaret Mercer Elphinstone, and the heirs male of her body. On 15 December 1801 he was created Baron Keith, of Stonehaven Marischal in the County of Kincardine, in the Peerage of the United Kingdom, with normal remainder to heirs male. In 1803 he was made Baron Keith, of Banheath in the County of Dumbarton, in the Peerage of the United Kingdom, with remainder to his daughter and only child from his first marriage, Margaret Mercer Elphinstone and the heirs male of her body. In 1814 Lord Keith was further honoured when he was made Viscount Keith in the Peerage of the United Kingdom, with normal remainder to heirs male.

He died on 10 March 1823, when the viscountcy and barony of 1801 became extinct as he had no sons, while the baronies of 1797 and 1803 passed according to the special remainders to his daughter, the second Baroness. She was married to the French aristocrat Charles Joseph, comte de Flahaut. In 1837 she also succeeded her cousin as 7th Lady Nairne although she was not recognised in the title. Lady Keith was a prominent society hostess in both London and Paris. She had five daughters but no sons and on her death in 1867 the baronies of 1797 and 1803 became extinct as well. She was succeeded in the Scottish lordship of Nairne by her eldest daughter Emily Petty-Fitzmaurice, Marchioness of Lansdowne, who became the 8th Lady Nairne (see Lord Nairne for further history of this title).

The title Lord Keith of Inverury was created in the Peerage of Scotland in 1677. For more information on this creation, see Earl of Kintore. Three life peers have taken the title Baron Keith in United Kingdom, two Law Lords under the Appellate Jurisdiction Act 1876: Baron Keith of Avonholm (1953), Baron Keith of Kinkel (1977) and a third life peerage under the Life Peerages Act 1958, Baron Keith of Castleacre (1980).

Barons Keith; First and third creations (1797/1803)
George Keith Elphinstone, 1st Viscount Keith, 1st Baron Keith (1746–1823)
Margaret Keith, 2nd Baroness Keith (1788–1867)

Barons Keith; Second creation (1801)
George Keith Elphinstone, 1st Viscount Keith, 1st Baron Keith (1746–1823)

See also
Lord Elphinstone
Earl Marischal
Lord Nairne

References

Extinct baronies in the Peerage of Ireland
Extinct baronies in the Peerage of the United Kingdom
Noble titles created in 1797
1797 establishments in Ireland
Noble titles created in 1801
1801 establishments in the United Kingdom
Noble titles created in 1803
Noble titles created for UK MPs
1803 establishments in the United Kingdom
1823 disestablishments in the United Kingdom
1867 disestablishments in the United Kingdom
1867 disestablishments in Ireland
Peerages created with special remainders